In Greek mythology, Halia (Ancient Greek:  or , means 'the dweller in the sea') was a woman who according to Rhodian tradition became the sea-goddess Leucothea.

Family 
Halia was a daughter of Thalassa (the sea), and sister to the Telchines.

Mythology 
According to the account by Diodorus Siculus, Poseidon fell in love with Halia, and fathered on her six sons and one daughter, Rhodos, who later became the wife of Helios and the one after whom the island of Rhodes was named. While Aphrodite was journeying from Cythera to Cyprus, she attempted to make a stop at Rhodes. Poseidon and Halia's sons however drove her away. In anger, Aphrodite cursed them with lust over their mother, so they raped Halia. When Poseidon learnt of this, he buried them deep beneath the soil, as Halia cast herself at the sea. She then became the goddess Leucothea, who is usually in other traditions identified with the Theban queen Ino instead. She was worshipped as a divine being by the Rhodians.

See also 
 Jocasta
 Aegypius
 Tethys

Notes

References 
 Apollodorus. Apollodorus, The Library, with an English Translation by Sir James George Frazer, F.B.A., F.R.S. in 2 Volumes. Cambridge, MA, Harvard University Press; London, William Heinemann Ltd. 1921. Includes Frazer's notes.
 Diodorus Siculus, Library of History, Volume III: Books 4.59-8, translated by C. H. Oldfather, Loeb Classical Library No. 340. Cambridge, Massachusetts, Harvard University Press, 1939. . Online version at Harvard University Press. Online version by Bill Thayer.
 
 Odes. Pindar. Diane Arnson Svarlien. 1990.
 William Smith. A Dictionary of Greek and Roman biography and mythology. London. John Murray: printed by Spottiswoode and Co., New-Street Square and Parliament Street.

External links 
 HALIA from The Theoi Project

Rhodian mythology
Rhodian characters in Greek mythology
Women in Greek mythology
Women of Poseidon
Mythological rape victims
Deeds of Aphrodite
Incest in Greek mythology
Religion in ancient Rhodes
Mortal parents of demigods in classical mythology